William Burn Walker (1891–1968) was an English professional footballer who played as an outside left in the Football League for Fulham and Lincoln City. He was the first Fulham player to receive a red card in a Football League match, versus Bradford City on 15 February 1913.

Personal life 

Walker served in the British Army during the First World War and the malaria he contracted in Palestine eventually ended his football career.

Career statistics

References 

English footballers
Association football outside forwards
Fulham F.C. players
English Football League players

Footballers from Darlington
1891 births
1968 deaths
Darlington F.C. players
Lincoln City F.C. players
British Army personnel of World War I